The Kingston Raiders was a short-lived name used by a Kingston, Ontario, Canada-based major junior ice hockey team in the Ontario Hockey League for the 1988–89 season only. The team played out of the Kingston Memorial Centre.

Team history
When the Kingston Canadians were sold in 1988, the club's name was changed to Kingston Raiders for the 1988–89 season by the new owner, Lou Kazowski. After a dismal season in 1987–88, he hoped that the team could acquire the "tough" image of the Los Angeles Raiders football team by adopting their name and new  black and silver uniforms, similar to those recently adopted by the NHL's Los Angeles Kings. In their only season of existence, the Raiders finished 7th in the Leyden division and did not qualify for the playoffs.

The team's coach was Larry Mavety. It was his first year in Kingston after many years coaching the Belleville Bulls. Larry would also go on to coach the Frontenacs in two different stints.

Kazowski was extremely unpopular locally, and after a number of disputes with the OHL and an unsuccessful season, he was encouraged to sell the team and was effectively barred from future ownership. The new owners included Wren Blair and Bob Attersley, who renamed the team Kingston Frontenacs after the EPHL team of which they had both been members.

Players
The Kingston Raiders had the first overall pick in the draft that year and chose Drake Berehowsky. Berehowsky would win the Jack Ferguson Award for being the first overall draft pick.

Jeff Wilson won the F.W. "Dinty" Moore Trophy, for the best goals against average for a rookie goaltender (1988–89).

From this team, six players made the NHL.

The last remaining active former member of the Kingston Raiders was Justin Morrison, who played his final OHL game in the 1992–93 season.

NHL alumni

Source

Season stats 1988–1989

1988–89 Out of playoffs.

View Kingston Raiders 1988-1989 stats

Arena
Kingston Memorial Centre The OHL Arena & Travel Guide

Defunct Ontario Hockey League teams
Sport in Kingston, Ontario
1988 establishments in Ontario
1989 disestablishments in Ontario
Ice hockey clubs established in 1988
Sports clubs disestablished in 1989